The 2011 World TeamTennis season was the 36th season of the top professional tennis league in the United States. Before the start of the 2011 season, the New York Buzz and the New York Sportimes merged into one New York team, the NY Sportimes.

Competition format
The 2011 World TeamTennis season included 9 teams, split into two conferences (Eastern and Western). The Eastern Conference had 4 teams, while the Western Conference 5 teams. Each team played a 14 match regular season schedule, with 7 home and 7 away matches. World TeamTennis’s playoff format consisted of the top two teams in each conference playing a semifinal on either July 22 (Eastern Conference) or July 23 (Western Conference), and the winners of each match playing in the final on July 24, 2011.

Standings
 As of July 22, 2011

Results table

Playoffs

References

External links
 Official WTT website
 WTT Media Guide 2011

World Team season
World TeamTennis season
World TeamTennis seasons